Hoover is an unincorporated community located in Garvin County, Oklahoma along Oklahoma State Highway 7.  It contains the remains of Fort Arbuckle, a fort used in the 1800s to train men in fighting the local Native Americans.

References

Garvin County, Oklahoma